David Shields (born January 27, 1991) is an American former professional ice hockey defenseman. He last played with the EC VSV of the Austrian Hockey League (EBEL). Shields was selected by the St. Louis Blues in the 6th round (168th overall) of the 2009 NHL Entry Draft.

Playing career
Prior to turning professional, Shields played four seasons (2007–2011) of major junior hockey in the Ontario Hockey League with the Erie Otters.

On March 23, 2011, the St. Louis Blues signed Shields to an entry level contract and he began the 2011–12 season in the AHL with the Peoria Rivermen.

At the conclusion of his entry-level contract Shields was re-signed to a one-year, two-way extension to remain within the Blues organization on July 9, 2014.

As a free agent after four professional seasons with the Blues affiliates, Shields signed a one-year ECHL contract with the Adirondack Thunder on September 28, 2015. He attended the Albany Devils training camp on an invite, however was released to begin the 2015–16 season for the Thunder's inaugural campaign. On December 10, 2015, Shields was signed to a professional try-out with the Utica Comets of the AHL. Having made an impression upon the Comets, he remained with the club for the remainder of the campaign, featuring in 32 games providing 10 points.

On July 11, 2016, Shields accepted a contract as a free agent to continue with the Utica Comets, agreeing to a one-year deal.

On July 13, 2017, Shields left the AHL as a free agent and signed a one-year contract with the EC VSV of the EBEL.

Career statistics

References

External links

1991 births
Living people
Adirondack Thunder players
Alaska Aces (ECHL) players
American men's ice hockey defensemen
Chicago Wolves players
Erie Otters players
Peoria Rivermen (AHL) players
St. Louis Blues draft picks
Ice hockey players from New York (state)
Sportspeople from Rochester, New York
Utica Comets players
EC VSV players